Giambattista Bonis (born 27 June 1926) is an Italian former professional footballer who played as a striker.

Career 
Bonis played one game for Inter Milan in the 1946–47 Serie A, in a 1–0 win against Lazio.

References

Bibliography
 

1926 births
Possibly living people
People from Intra
Footballers from Piedmont
Italian footballers
Association football forwards
S.S. Verbania Calcio players
Inter Milan players
Spezia Calcio players
Serie A players
Serie B players
Sportspeople from the Province of Verbano-Cusio-Ossola